Sar Gust-e Bala (also Romanized as Sar Gūst-e Bālā; also known as Sar Gasht-e ‘Olyā, Sargosk-e Bālā, Sar Gost, and Sar Gost-e Bālā) is a village in Mosaferabad Rural District, Rudkhaneh District, Rudan County, Hormozgan Province, Iran. At the 2006 census, its population was 268, in 52 families.

References 

Populated places in Rudan County